Gonville & Caius AFC, more commonly known as Caius, is the representative football club of Gonville & Caius College, Cambridge, England. It is one of only a few university teams to have entered the FA Cup 1st round proper.

Caius football club has a long and distinguished history, entering the first Cuppers, the FA Cup 1st round proper in two years of the 19th century. The club has had numerous Blues, as well as an England international and Test cricket captain. Caius play their home games at Barton Road sports ground. The club enters four men's teams and a women's team into the Cambridge University Association Football League.

History
While no one knows exactly when Gonville & Caius College first had an official football club, it is highly likely that members of the college were playing football on Parker's Piece in the mid-19th century with other members of the university. Caius entered a team in the inaugural Cuppers tournament of 1882-1883, but took their place in history by entering the FA Cup in 1880-1881 and 1881-1882 as the only university team in the competition. The last year that Cambridge and Oxford university teams had entered was 1879-1880, the year in which Oxford finished as runners-up to Clapham Rovers. It was left to Caius to continue the Corinthian values of the amateur teams in the face of the impending dominance of professional clubs such as Blackburn Rovers and Preston North End. The challenge by Caius was not to be successful, with the team giving walkovers to Nottingham Forest in 1880 and Dreadnought in 1881. This was to mirror the end of an era for amateur clubs as the last year a university side competed in the 1st round of the FA Cup was the last year an amateur side would win the competition. The achievement of Caius has only been replicated once, in 2003, by Team Bath. Since 1881, Caius has only competed in intra-University competitions. In 2018 Caius won the Men's 2nd team, Men's 3rd team, and Women's Cuppers competition, which was one of the most successful years in club history.

References
Schindler, C. (1998). Manchester United ruined my life, Headline, 
An article in Varsity about college football, by Colin Schindler

External links
 Gonville & Caius AFC official website

Football clubs in England
Sport at the University of Cambridge
Afc